Chiarissimo d'Antonio Fancelli (died 1632) was an Italian sculptor and architect of the late-Mannerist and Baroque periods, mainly active in Tuscany. Domenico Pieratti and Giovanni Battista Pieratti were his pupils. It is unclear how he fits into the large pedigree of Tuscan sculptors including Cosimo and Luca Fancelli.

When Cosimo II de' Medici built the Loggia del Grano in Florence, Chiarissimo Fancelli provided a bust of Cosimo, and a fountain on the corner of the building, the Fontana del Mascherone.

References
 ULAN record.
 Baldinucci, Filippo (1728). Notizie de' Professori del Disegno, Da Cimabue in qua, Secolo V. dal 1610. al 1670. Distinto in Decennali. Stamperia S.A.R. per li Tartini, e Franchi (Googlebooks entry). p. 136.

1632 deaths
17th-century Italian sculptors
Italian male sculptors
Italian Baroque sculptors
Year of birth unknown